Steffan Hughes (born  in Croydon, South London) is a rugby league footballer who played in the 1990s and 2000s.

References

External links
London Broncos profile
(archived by web.archive.org) Statistics at slstats.org

1981 births
Living people
English rugby league players
London Broncos players
People from Croydon
Rugby league centres
Rugby league locks
Rugby league players from Greater London
Rugby league second-rows
Wales national rugby league team players
Rugby articles needing expert attention